The 1960 Gator Bowl was a college football bowl game between the Georgia Tech Yellow Jackets representing the Southeastern Conference (SEC) and the Southwest Conference (SWC) co-champion Arkansas Razorbacks. Arkansas defeated Georgia Tech, 14–7, in front of 45,104 spectators. There were two players named Most Valuable Player: Jim Mooty of Arkansas and Maxie Baughan of Georgia Tech.

Setting

The 1960 Gator Bowl featured Georgia Tech, led by Bobby Dodd, against his protege Frank Broyles, who coached Arkansas, and was a former GT alumnus. Georgia Tech was 11–2 in bowl games entering the contest.

Georgia Tech started 4–0, but struggled the rest of the year, losing to Auburn, Duke, and Georgia at home, and Alabama in Birmingham.

Arkansas finished their SWC schedule 5–1, losing only to #3 Texas. The Hogs also lost to #6 Ole Miss at Crump Stadium in a non-conference match-up.

The Yellow Jackets and Razorbacks had one common opponent, the SMU Mustangs (5–4–1), who Georgia Tech defeated 16–12 and lost to the Arkansas, 17–14.

Game summary
Georgia Tech began the game by controlling the ball for over eleven minutes before failing a field goal from the Arkansas 8-yard line. However, it took only two plays on Tech's second drive to hit pay dirt as Georgia Tech quarterback Marvin Tibbetts scrambled 51 yards for a touchdown. Joe Paul Alberty scored from one yard out on the ensuing Razorback possession to tie the game at 7. Razorback rushers Lance Alworth and Jim Mooty took over in the third quarter, working in tandem to go 78 yards with Mooty finishing with a 19 yard score.

Arkansas' record in the postseason improved to 2–1–2, with Tech dropping to 11–3.

Two members were later inducted into the Gator Bowl Hall of Fame, Maxie Baughan, a center and linebacker named an All-American during 1959 from Georgia Tech, and Frank Broyles, the head coach of Arkansas.

References

Gator Bowl
Gator Bowl
Georgia Tech Yellow Jackets football bowl games
Arkansas Razorbacks football bowl games
20th century in Jacksonville, Florida
Gator Bowl (January)
Gator Bowl